The Minister of Health is a part of the Cabinet of Iceland. It is currently a part of the Ministry of Welfare.

History 
The cabinet position existed between 20 November 1959 and 1 January 1970 and again between 1 January 2008 and 31 December 2010. The Ministry of Health existed alongside the Minister after 1 January 1970, when the Cabinet of Iceland Act no. 73/1969 took effect, since ministries had not formally existed separately from the ministers. Between 1 January 1970 and 1 January 2008 the position became Minister of Health and Social Security, and the ministry itself was renamed accordingly. On 31 December 2010, the Ministry of Health was merged with the Ministry of Social Affairs and Social Security to form the Ministry of Welfare.

List of ministers

Minister of Health (20 November 1959 – 1 January 1970)

Minister of Health and Social Security (1 January 1970 – 1 January 2008) 

The Cabinet of Iceland Act no. 73/1969, which had been passed by the parliament 28 May 1969, took effect on 1 January 1970, thus the Cabinet was formally established along with its ministries, which had up until then not formally existed separately from the ministers.

Minister of Health (1 January 2008 – 31 December 2010)

Minister of Health (23 May 2013 – present)

References 

 Health